Coby Michael Jones (born August 15, 2003) is an American professional soccer player who plays as a defender for USL Championship club Sporting Kansas City II.

Club career
Born in Topeka, Kansas but raised in Olathe, Jones joined the Sporting Kansas City academy in early 2016. He helped the SKC Academy U-13s win the 2017 Kansas State Cup, assisting the game-winning goal in the final. On June 22, 2021, it was announced Jones had signed an academy contract to play with Sporting's USL Championship side Sporting Kansas City II. He made his debut on June 23, 2021, appearing as an 84th-minute substitute during a 1–0 loss to OKC Energy. He scored his first goal on July 2, 2021, vs. Louisville City FC. Sporting Kansas City II signed Jones for its first season in MLS NEXT Pro in March 2022.

Career statistics

References

External links
 Profile at Sporting Kansas City

2003 births
American soccer players
Association football defenders
Living people
MLS Next Pro players
Sportspeople from Olathe, Kansas
Soccer players from Kansas
Sporting Kansas City II players
USL Championship players